Brooklyn Football Club was an Irish association football club, originally based in the Merchants Quay district of Dublin.  Brooklyn were active in the 1920s and played in the Leinster Senior League, the League of Ireland and the FAI Cup. They took their name from Brooklyn Terrace and played their home games at nearby Chalgrove Terrace. Both locations no longer exist and have since been redeveloped.

History

Leinster Senior League 
In 1921–22 Brooklyn were playing in the Leinster Senior League. Other teams in this league this season included Shamrock Rovers, Bohemians B, St James's Gate B, Bray Unknowns, Shelbourne United, Pioneers, Midland Athletic, Merrion, Glasnevin, CYMS and Richmond.

League of Ireland
Brooklyn played in the League of Ireland for just two seasons – 1923–24 and 1924–25. On both occasions they finished 8th in a ten team league. They also competed in the 1923–24 and 1924–25 FAI Cups. At the end of their second season in the league, Brooklyn failed to get re-elected and were subsequently replaced by Brideville for the 1925–26 season.

Notable former players

Ireland internationals
The following Brooklyn players represented Ireland at full international level. Joe Kendrick and Tony Huntson both represented Ireland while playing for Brooklyn.

  Jimmy Bermingham
  Tony Huntson 
  Joe Kendrick

References

Association football clubs in Dublin (city)
Brooklyn
Former Leinster Senior League clubs
Association football clubs established in the 1920s
Association football clubs disestablished in 1925
1920s establishments in Ireland
1925 disestablishments in Ireland